Shigeyuki Nishio (born 23 May 1954) is a Japanese former professional tennis player.

Biography
Born in Kobe, Nishio was an aggressive serve and volley player whose Davis Cup career for Japan spanned nine years and a total of 13 ties.

At the 1978 Asian Games he finished with a silver medal in the men's singles, behind Indonesia's Atet Wijono. He also won bronze medals in the mixed doubles and team events. 

All of his main draw appearances on the Grand Prix circuit came in his home country, which included making the round of 16 at the 1979 Japan Open Tennis Championships. 

He played in two grand slam main draws, in the men's doubles at the 1979 Wimbledon Championships and 1980 French Open, both times partnering Shinichi Sakamoto.

See also
List of Japan Davis Cup team representatives

References

External links
 
 
 

1954 births
Living people
Japanese male tennis players
Asian Games medalists in tennis
Asian Games silver medalists for Japan
Asian Games bronze medalists for Japan
Medalists at the 1978 Asian Games
Tennis players at the 1978 Asian Games
Sportspeople from Kobe
20th-century Japanese people
21st-century Japanese people